Samuel David Bird (born 12 March 2003) is an English professional footballer who plays for Fleetwood Town, as a defender.

Career
Bird progressed through the Academy at Fleetwood Town and signed his first professional contract with the club on 26 April 2021, signing a deal until the 2021–22 season, with the option of a further year in the club's favour. He had been an ever-present for the under-18 side over the campaign, scoring a memorable goal in the FA Youth Cup Fourth Round against Bristol City.

He signed on loan for National League North side Farsley Celtic on a month-long deal, following a spate of injuries and suspensions for their defence. Bird had impressed Farsley manager, Adam Lakeland, when playing against Fleetwood in a pre-season friendly weeks earlier and the two clubs had a strong relationship having loaned quite a few players of the past couple of years.

On 31 December 2021, he signed a new one-year extended contract with the club until June 2023, again with another year option in the club's favour. He had made the step-up to the first team for the 2021–22 campaign and made his debut against Barrow in the EFL Trophy on 5 October, replacing Chiekh Thiam as a substitute. His full debut came weeks later in the same competition as Fleetwood lost 1–0 to Bolton Wanderers. He also made the bench on a number of occasions for matches in EFL League One since then.

On 28 January 2022, he signed for Northern Premier League Premier Division side Hyde United for his second loan deal of the season, for an initial one month.

Career statistics

References

External links

2003 births
Living people
Fleetwood Town F.C. players
Farsley Celtic F.C. players
Hyde United F.C. players
National League (English football) players
Northern Premier League players
Association football defenders
English footballers